Mandalay General Hospital (abbreviated MGH) is a major teaching hospital in Mandalay, Myanmar, with a bed capacity of 1,500. It serves as the primary teaching institution for University of Medicine, Mandalay, alongside Mandalay Workers' Hospital. It is located on 30th Street, between 74th and 77th Streets in Chanayethazan Township. The hospital treats over 1,200 patients per day. The hospital is currently led by Dr Su Su Dwe.

Mandalay General Hospital was founded in 1887 by the British authorities as a civil medical establishment for Upper Burma.

The building was inaugurated on 28 March 2015.

Departments 
MGH maintains both medical and surgical specialist departments and diagnostic departments.

Specialist departments 

 Department of Anaesthesiology and Intensive Care Medicine
 Department of Cardiovascular Medicine 
 Department of Cardiovascular Surgery 
 Department of Clinical Haematology
 Department of Dermatology
 Department of Diabetes and Endocrinology
 Department of Emergency Medicine
 Department of Gastroenterology
 Department of Hepatology
 Department of Hepatobiliary and Pancreatic Surgery
 Department of Medical Oncology
 Department of Nephrology
 Department of Neurology
 Department of Neurosurgery
 Department of Plastic, Maxillofacial & Oral Surgery
 Department of Physical Medicine & Rehabilitation
 Department of Radiation Oncology
 Department of Respiratory Medicine
 Department of Rheumatology
 Department of Thoracic Surgery
 Department of Tropical and Infectious Diseases
 Department of Urology
 General Medical Units (1, 2 & 3)
 General Surgical Units (1, 2 & 3)
 Trauma care unit
 Upper Myanmar Heart Centre
 Intensive Care Cardiovascular Unit (Cardiac Intensive Care Unit and Coronary Care Unit (CCU))
 Diagnostic and Therapeutic Cardiovascular Catheterisation Laboratories
 Operation Theatres
 Heart Failure Clinic 
 Cardiac Rehabilitation Clinic
 Special Skin Clinic
 Diabetic Clinic 
 Dentistry Clinic
 Mental Health Clinic 
 Acute Burn Care Unit
 Isolation Ward
 Pain and Palliative Care Unit

Diagnostics departments 

 Department of Radiology (MRI, CT , Xray, USS)
 Department of Pathology
 Department of Microbiology
 Department of Nuclear Medicine
 Diagnostic Cardiovascular Catheterisation Laboratories
 Non-invasive Cardiovascular Diagnostic Lab
 Endoscopy Centre
 Neuroelectrophyisological Centre

Auxiliary departments 

 Department of Forensic Medicine
 Blood Bank
 Medical Record Department
 Bio-Medical Engineering Department
 Kitchen
 Laundry
 Motor Transport

Clinical training

Undergraduate
 M.B.,B.S. degree

Diploma
 Dip.Med.Sc.
 TB and Chest Diseases
 Family Medicine
 Primary Emergency Care
 Clinical Pharmacology
 STD
 Transfusion Medicine

Graduate 

 M.Med.Sc. degree
 Pathology
 Microbiology
 Medical Jurisprudence
 Orthopaedics and Traumatology
 Anaesthesia
 Radiology
 Physical Medicine and Rehabilitation
 Dermatology
 Internal Medicine
 Surgery
 Cardiovascular Surgery
 Neurosurgery
 Plastic, Maxilofacial and Oral Surgery
 Thoracic Surgery
 Urology

Doctorate
 Dr.Med.Sc. degree
 General Medicine
 General Surgery
 Orthopaedics and Traumatology
 Cardiology
 Cardiovascular Surgery
 Neurology
 Neurosurgery
 Gastroenterology
 Hepatology
 Hepatobiliary and Pancreatic Surgery
 Endocrinology
 Rheumatology
 Nephrology
 Respiratory Medicine
 Clinical Haematology
 Anaesthesia
 Radiology
 Physical Medicine and Rehabilitation
 Plastic, Maxillo-facial and Oral Surgery
 Thoracic Surgery
 Urology

Nursing
 Nursing Training

Medical Technology
 Medical Technology 
Medical Imaging Technology or Radiography 
Physiotherapy
Medical Laboratory Technology

References

Hospitals in Myanmar
Hospitals established in 1887